STX may refer to:

Businesses
Seagate Technology, a hard drive manufacturer with stock symbol STX
STX (sports manufacturer), a sports manufacturer based in Baltimore, Maryland
STX Corporation (System Technology Excellence), a Korea-based holding company
STX Entertainment, a Los Angeles-based motion picture production and distribution company
STX Europe, a ship builder

Chemistry
Saxitoxin, a neurotoxin found in marine dinoflagellates
Shiga toxin
Syntaxin, a membrane integrated Q-SNARE protein participating in exocytosis

Computing
A secure private telephone network used by London Stock Exchange affiliated firms and professionals
PASTI raw disk image format for the Atari ST
Start of Text, a control code in the C0 control code set
Socket Technology EXtended, the Mini-STX computer form factor
Streaming Transformations for XML, an XML transformation language
Structured text, a plaintext markup language

Places
Henry E. Rohlsen Airport (IATA code: STX), an airport on St. Croix, U.S. Virgin Islands
South Texas
St Croix, U.S. Virgin Islands
St Cross College, Oxford

Other uses
Case STX Steiger, a tractorline built by Case IH
Star Trek: Nemesis, the 10th film in the Star Trek film franchise (Star Trek X)
Almen studentereksamen, an examination used in Denmark for the secondary school called gymnasium